The Andalusian dialects of Spanish are spoken in Andalusia, Ceuta, Melilla, and Gibraltar. They include perhaps the most distinct of the southern variants of peninsular Spanish, differing in many respects from northern varieties in a number of phonological, morphological and lexical features. Many of these are innovations which, spreading from Andalusia, failed to reach the higher strata of Toledo and Madrid speech and become part of the Peninsular norm of standard Spanish. Andalusian Spanish has historically been stigmatized at a national level, though this appears to have changed in recent decades, and there is evidence that the speech of Seville or the  enjoys high prestige within Western Andalusia.

Due to the large population of Andalusia, Andalusian dialects are among the most widely spoken dialects in Spain. Within the Iberian Peninsula, other southern varieties of Spanish share some core elements of Andalusian, mainly in terms of phonetics  notably Extremaduran Spanish and Murcian Spanish as well as, to a lesser degree, Manchegan Spanish.

Canarian Spanish is also strongly similar to Western Andalusian Spanish due to its settlement history.

Phonology

Sibilants 

The pronunciation of these sounds in Andalusia differs geographically, socially, and among individual speakers, and there has also been some shift in favor of the standard . As testament to the prevalence of intra-speaker variation,  found that many Andalusians alternate between a variety of sibilants, with little discernible pattern. While  is stigmatized and usually associated with rural areas, it is worth noting that it was historically found in some large cities such as Huelva and Cádiz, although not in the more prestigious cities of Seville and Córdoba.

Above all in eastern Andalusia, but also in locations in western Andalusia such as Huelva, Jerez, and Seville, there is a shift towards . The strong influence of media and school may be driving this shift.

 provides a map showing the different ways of pronouncing these sounds in different parts of Andalusia. These sources generally highlight the most common pronunciation, in colloquial speech, in a given locality.

Likewise,  is found in southern Huelva, most of Seville, including an area surrounding but not including the capital, all of Cádiz including the capital, most of Málaga, western Granada, and parts of southern Almería.

Outside Andalusia, seseo also existed in parts of western Badajoz, including the capital, as of 1933, though it was in decline in many places and associated with the lower class.  was likewise found, in 1933, in a southern, coastal area of Murcia around the city of Cartagena, and in parts of southern Alicante such as Torrevieja, near the linguistic border with Valencian.  was also found in the Murcian villages of Perín and Torre-Pacheco, also near the coast.

Other general features 
Andalusian Spanish phonology includes a large number of other distinctive features, compared to other dialects. Many of these are innovations, especially lenitions and mergers, and some of Andalusian Spanish's most distinct lenitions and mergers occur in the syllable coda. A number of these features, so characteristic of Spain's south, may have ultimately originated in Astur-leonese speaking areas of north-western Spain, where they can still be found.

The leniting of syllable-final consonants is quite frequent in middle-class speech, and some level of lenition is sociolinguistically unmarked within Andalusia, forming part of the local standard. That said, Andalusian speakers do tend to reduce the rate of syllable-final lenition in formal speech.

Yeísmo, or the merging of  into , is general in most of Andalusia, and may likely be able to trace its origin to Astur-leonese settlers. That said, pockets of a distinction remain in rural parts of Huelva, Seville, and Cadiz. This merger has since spread to most of Latin American Spanish, and, in recent decades, to most of urban Peninsular Spanish. In Western Andalusian,  is an affricate  in all instances, whereas in standard Spanish this realisation only occurs after a nasal or pause.

 is usually aspirated, or pronounced , except in some eastern Andalusian sub-varieties (i.e. Jaén, Granada, Almería provinces), where the dorsal  is retained. This aspirated pronunciation is also heard in most of Extremadura and parts of Cantabria.

This features is shared with many other varieties of Spanish, including much of Latin America and the Canary Islands, as well as much of northwestern Spain, the likely origin of this velarization. This syllable-final nasal can even be deleted, leaving behind just a nasal vowel at the end of a word.

This is especially common in the past participle; e.g.  becomes  ('I have finished'). For the - suffix, this feature is common to all peninsular variants of Spanish, while in other positions it is widespread throughout most of the southern half of Spain. Also, as occurs in most of the Spanish-speaking world, final  is usually dropped. This widespread elision of intervocalic  throughout the vocabulary is also shared with several Asturian and Cantabrian dialects, pointing to a possible Asturian origin for this feature. This is the continuation of the tendency of lenition in Vulgar Latin which developed into the Romance languages.

One conservative feature of Andalusian Spanish is the way some people retain an  sound in words which had such a sound in medieval Spanish, which originally comes from a Latin , i.e. Latin  'stuffed, full' →   (standard Spanish  'fed up'). This also occurs in the speech of Extremadura and some other western regions, and it was carried to Latin America by Andalusian settlers, where it also enjoys low status. Nowadays, this characteristic is limited to rural areas in Western Andalusia and the flamenco culture. This feature may be connected to northwestern settlers during the reconquista, who came from areas such as eastern Asturias where  had, as in Old Castile, become .

('s/he listens').

Coda obstruents and liquids 
A list of Andalusian lenitions and mergers in the syllable coda that affect obstruent and liquid consonants includes:
The simple aspiration of final  as  occurs in the speech of all social classes within Andalusia, and is the most widespread form of -lenition outside Andalusia. S-aspiration is general in all of the southern half of Spain, and now becoming common in the northern half too.
This can also occur at morpheme boundaries within a word, as in  being pronounced .
 In Eastern Andalusian dialects, as well as Murcian Spanish, the preceding vowel becomes lax when before an underlying elided obstruent. Thus, in these varieties one distinguishes casa  ('house') and casas  ('houses') by vowel quality, whereas northern Spanish speakers would have central vowels in both words and a terminal alveolar  in casas.
 There is disagreement as to whether or not  are affected by this process, although most evidence shows they are lowered to a moderate degree.
 The quality of word-final lax , typically transcribed , differs according to a number of geographic and social factors. It may be lower than a typical word-final , or it may instead simply be fronted.

In addition to this, a process of vowel harmony may take place where tense vowels that precede a lax vowel may become lax themselves, e.g. trébol  ('clover, club') vs tréboles  ('clovers, clubs').

 Liquids can be aspirated as well. Also, liquids and obstruents often assimilate to the following consonant, producing gemination; e.g. perla  ('pearl'), carne  ('meat'), adquirí  ('I acquired'), mismo  ('same'), desde  ('from'), rasgos  ('traits').
 In Andalusian Spanish a voiced obstruent may assimilate the voicelessness of a preceding , while that same  may assimilate the place of articulation of the following consonant. As a result, both merge as a single voiceless consonant; Thus,  is often assimilated to  before , as in desbaratar → *effaratar  ('to ruin, to disrupt'), to  before , as in   'the attics', and to  before , as in   'feature'. This kind of devoicing is less widespread, geographically and socially, than simple assimilation. 
 Final  may also become  (where  or  occur) before , as in ascensor  ('lift').

 Mainly in Western Andalusia, /s/-aspiration can result in post-aspiration of following voiceless stops, as in  pronounced .
 As a likely related change,  may be pronounced as an affricate . This change is recent, being led by young women, and is present at least in Seville and Antequera.
 Intervocalic  are usually voiced, especially in male speech, and can even become approximants.
The opposite may also happen, i.e.  becomes  (e.g. sartén  'frying pan'). As briefly mentioned above, aspirated and assimilated realizations ( for ) are also common. Neutralization of final  and  never occurs before a vowel, even at word boundaries.  is always . These consonants may also be dropped in utterance-final position. Because of this variation in final liquid consonants, transcriptions in this article follow the distribution found in Standard Peninsular Spanish.
 In Western Andalusian, an aspirated  before  can be elided due to the fact that  itself is glottal.

Morphology and syntax 
Subject pronouns 
Many Western Andalusian speakers replace the informal second person plural  with the formal  (without the formal connotation, as happens in other parts of Spain).
Object pronouns
Although mass media have generalised the use of le as a pronoun for animate, masculine direct objects, a phenomenon known as leísmo, many Andalusians still use the normative lo, as in lo quiero mucho (instead of le quiero mucho), which is also more conservative with regards to the Latin etymology of these pronouns. The Asturleonese dialects of northwestern Spain are similarly conservative, lacking leísmo, and the dominance of this more conservative direct object pronoun system in Andalusia may be due to the presence of Asturleonese settlers in the Reconquista. Subsequent dialect levelling in newly founded Andalusian towns would favor the more simple grammatical system, that is, the one without leísmo. 
Laísmo (the substitution of indirect pronoun le with la, as in the sentence la pegó una bofetada a ella) is similarly typical of central Spain and not present in Andalusia, and, though not prescriptively correct according to the RAE, is frequently heard on Radio and TV programmes.
Verbs
The standard form of the second-person plural imperative with a reflexive pronoun (os) is -aos, or -aros in informal speech, whereas in Andalusian, and other dialects, too, -se is used instead, so ¡callaos ya! / ¡callaros ya! ('shut up!') becomes ¡callarse ya! and ¡sentaos! / ¡sentaros! ('sit down!') becomes ¡sentarse!.
Gender
The gender of some words may not match that of Standard Spanish, e.g. la calor not el calor ('the heat'), el chinche not la chinche ('the bedbug').
La mar is also more frequently used than el mar. La mar de and tela de are lexicalised expressions to mean a lot of....

Lexicon 
Many words of Mozarabic, Romani and Old Spanish origin occur in Andalusian which are not found in other dialects in Spain (but many of these may occur in South American and, especially, in Caribbean Spanish dialects due to the greater influence of Andalusian there). For example: chispenear instead of standard lloviznar or chispear ('to drizzle'), babucha instead of zapatilla ('slipper'), chavea instead of chaval ('kid') or antié for anteayer ('the day before yesterday').
A few words of Andalusi Arabic origin that have become archaisms or unknown in general Spanish can be found, together with multitude of sayings: e.g. haciendo morisquetas (from the word morisco, meaning pulling faces and gesticulating, historically associated with Muslim prayers). These can be found in older texts of Andalusi. There are some doublets of Arabic-Latinate synonyms with the Arabic form being more common in Andalusian like Andalusian alcoba for standard habitación or dormitorio ('bedroom') or alhaja for standard joya ('jewel').

Influence
Some words pronounced in the Andalusian dialects have entered general Spanish with a specific meaning. One example is juerga, ("debauchery", or "partying"), the Andalusian pronunciation of huelga (originally "period without work", now "work strike"). The flamenco lexicon incorporates many Andalusisms, for example, cantaor, tocaor, and bailaor, which are examples of the dropped "d"; in standard spelling these would be cantador, tocador, and bailador, while the same terms in more general Spanish may be cantante, músico, and bailarín. Note that, when referring to the flamenco terms, the correct spelling drops the "d"; a flamenco cantaor is written this way, not cantador. In other cases, the dropped "d" may be used in standard Spanish for terms closely associated with Andalusian culture. For example, pescaíto frito ("little fried fish") is a popular dish in Andalusia, and this spelling is used in many parts of Spain when referring to this dish. For general usage, the spelling would be pescadito frito.

Llanito, the vernacular of the British overseas territory of Gibraltar, is based on Andalusian Spanish, with British English and other influences.

Language movement

In Andalusia, there is a fringe movement promoting the status of Andalusian as a separate language and not as a dialect of Spanish.

See also
Castúo
Spanish dialects and varieties
Standard Spanish
The cant Caló is pronounced with Andalusian phonetics among Andalusian Romani
Andalusi Arabic

References

External links
Isogloss maps of phonetic variants in the Iberian Peninsula
Ariza, Manuel: Lingüística e historia de Andalucía
Gomez Solis, Felipe: Contribucion a las Historia Linguistica de Andalucia: Cordoba.
Morillo-Velarde Pérez, Ramon: "Un modelo de variación sintáctica dialectal: El demostrativo de realce en el andaluz".
Castilian-Andalusian phonetic transformer

Bibliography

Further reading
Guitarte, Guillermo L. (1992): "Cecear y palabras afines" (en Cervantes Virtual)
Ropero Núñez, Miguel (1992): "Un aspecto de lexicología histórica marginado: los préstamos del caló" (en Cervantes Virtual)

 
Andalusian culture
Spanish dialects of Spain